Veeti Vuorio (born 20 May 1996) is a Finnish ice hockey player. He is currently playing with HC TPS in the Finnish Liiga.

On 12 March 2015, Vuorio made his Liiga debut playing with HC TPS during the 2014–15 season.

References

External links

1996 births
Living people
Finnish ice hockey forwards
HC TPS players
Sportspeople from Turku